Before Stonewall: The Making of a Gay and Lesbian Community  is a 1984 American documentary film about the LGBT community prior to the 1969 Stonewall riots. It was narrated by author Rita Mae Brown, directed by Greta Schiller, co-directed by Robert Rosenberg, and co-produced by John Scagliotti and Rosenberg, and Schiller. It premiered at the 1984 Toronto International Film Festival and was released in the United States on June 27, 1985. In 1999, producer Scagliotti directed a companion piece, After Stonewall. To celebrate the 30th anniversary of the Teddy Awards, the film was shown at the 66th Berlin International Film Festival in February 2016. To commemorate the 50th anniversary of the Stonewall riots in 2019, the film was restored and re-released by First Run Features in June 2019. Later in 2019, the film was selected by the Library of Congress for preservation in the United States National Film Registry for being "culturally, historically, or aesthetically significant".

People featured

 Ann Bannon
 Lisa Ben
 Gladys Bentley
 Ivy Bottini
 George Buse
 Carroll Davis
 Martin Duberman
 Allen Ginsberg
 Barbara Gittings
 Barbara Grier
 Mabel Hampton
 Harry Hay
 Dorothy "Smilie" Hillaire
 Evelyn Hooker
 Red Jordan Arobateau
 Frank Kameny
 Jim Kepner
 Audre Lorde
 Bruce Nugent
 Nell "Johnnie" Phelps
 Craig Rodwell
 José Sarria

Awards
Before Stonewall was nominated for the Grand Jury Prize at the 1985 Sundance Film Festival. It won the Best Film Award at the Houston International Film Festival, Best Documentary Feature at Filmex, First Place at the National Educational Film Festival, and  Honorable Mention at the Global Village Documentary Festival. In 1987, the film won Emmy Awards for Best Historical/Cultural Program and Best Research. In 1989, it won the Festival's Plate at the Torino International Gay & Lesbian Film Festival.

See also
After Stonewall, the 1999 sequel film about the 30 years of gay rights activism since 1969
The Times of Harvey Milk, the 1984 Oscar-winning documentary about the late San Francisco politician Harvey Milk
Stonewall, 2015 film by Roland Emmerich
1984 in film

References

External links
 Before Stonewall - Trailer (First Run official YouTube channel)
 Before Stonewall - Trailer (First Run official Vimeo channel)
 Before Stonewall: The Making of a Gay and Lesbian Community (Newly Restored) (First Run: official distributor)
 
 
 

1984 films
1984 documentary films
1984 independent films
1984 LGBT-related films
American documentary films
American independent films
American LGBT-related films
Documentary films about LGBT topics
Documentary films about United States history
Gay-related films
Lesbian-related films
Historiography of LGBT in the United States
Films set in the 1910s
Films set in the 1920s
Films set in the 1930s
Films set in the 1940s
Films set in the 1950s
Films set in the 1960s
First Run Features films
United States National Film Registry films
1980s English-language films
1980s American films